The EADS Barracuda is a jet powered unmanned aerial vehicle (UAV) currently under development by EADS, intended for the role of aerial reconnaissance and also combat (like UCAV). The aircraft is a joint venture between Germany and Spain.

Development of the project was stopped after the first prototype crashed at Mar Menor while approaching for landing during a test flight. The program was resumed in 2008, with a second prototype being completed in November 2008. The rebuilt Barracuda underwent a series of successful flight tests in Goose Bay, Canada during July 2009, followed by further flight campaigns in 2010 and 2012.

The Barracuda is primarily in competition with the Dassault nEUROn for strategic and defensive contracts. Both are stealthy and have a maximum air speed of around Mach 0.85. While Germany and Spain are behind the Barracuda, France, Italy, Sweden, Switzerland, Greece, and Spain are funding the nEUROn.

Development 

The Barracuda originated as a UAV design study, intended to push EADS into the market for medium-altitude long-range UAVs, a market they view as dominated by the United States and Israel. Its development began in 2003, with its official debut at the 2006 International Aerospace Exhibition, where military applications and specifications for the Barracuda were revealed. The Barracuda crashed in Mar Menor at Region de Murcia during a 2006 test flight, which put the project on hold until 2008. EADS' current focus is to get the Barracuda certified for unregulated flight in Germany's designated airspace, while the long-term goal is to have it certified for non-segregated airspace.

They also plan to develop the Barracuda as a modular platform, so that it can be refitted for various roles like maritime patrol. Offensive capabilities are not planned, but it may be refitted to carry weapons if customers express interest for it. The Barracuda may also be capable of carrying weapon systems. The systems would be installed in the central payload bay.

Germany is also discussing a partnership with Sweden and Italy for a multinational unmanned aerial vehicle effort in order to compete with the French-led Dassault nEUROn programme. Spain, Italy and Sweden are already participants in the French-led effort.

The Barracuda's maiden flight took place in April, 2006 at a remote location on the Iberian Peninsula. The flight was a success but the prototype crashed into the water of Mar Menor during a test flight just off the Spanish coast of Region de Murcia on September 23, 2006.

Design 

The Barracuda is based on commercially available 'off the shelf' components, but also many refined systems. Its fuselage is constructed entirely from carbon fibre, but also has a greater strength to weight ratio than traditional aircraft materials such as aluminum (the structure of the Eurofighter Typhoon and Boeing 787 Dreamliner are also made significantly out of it). The only significant metal component is the wing spar, running through the middle and reinforcing the wings. The wing spar allows for easy removal of the wings for transportation. The Barracuda uses a specially shaped fuselage, including S-duct air inlet and V-tail, to scatter deflected radar, rendering the UCAV stealthy.

Specifications

See also

References

Sources

External links 
 EADS Cassidian Barracuda page
 Air-Attack.com's page on the Barracuda

International unmanned aerial vehicles
2000s international military reconnaissance aircraft
Unmanned stealth aircraft
Barracuda
Single-engined jet aircraft
Mid-wing aircraft
Unmanned military aircraft of Germany
Aircraft first flown in 2006
Unmanned experimental aircraft
V-tail aircraft
Unmanned aerial vehicles of Spain